According to the Bible, Tola was one of the Judges of Israel. His career is summarised in Judges 10:1-2. He judged Israel for 23 years after Abimelech died. He lived at Shamir in Mount Ephraim, where he was also buried.

His name means "Crimson worm" or "scarlet stuff."

Of all the biblical judges, the least is written about Tola. None of his deeds are recorded. The entire account from Judges 10:1-2 (KJV) follows:
1And after Abimelech there arose to defend Israel Tola the son of Puah, the son of Dodo, a man of Issachar; and he dwelt in Shamir in mount Ephraim.
2And he judged Israel twenty and three years, and died, and was buried in Shamir.

See also 
Biblical judges
Book of Judges
List of minor biblical figures

References

External links
 Book of Judges article (Jewish Encyclopedia)
 

Judges of ancient Israel
12th-century BCE Hebrew people